Gerger is a town of Adıyaman Province of Turkey. It is the seat of Gerger District. It is mainly populated by Kurds of different tribal backgrounds and had a population of 2,753 in 2021. The mayor is Erkan Aksoy (AKP).

History 
According to The Geographical Journal in 1896, Gerger had 750 inhabitants with most being Kurds, with the exception of few Ottoman officials and Armenians.

In 2018, archaeologists discovered a cave which used during religious ceremonies by Christians during the Byzantine period. Cross figures found inside the cave.

References

Towns in Turkey
Populated places in Adıyaman Province
Gerger District
Kurdish settlements in Adıyaman Province